Lena Fayre, (pronounced "Lay-nah Fair") is a Dutch-American singer-songwriter from Los Angeles, California.

Career
Fayre released her debut single, "Belong to You", in December 2012. Weeks later, she released a video for the song and won "Best Music Video" at the 2013 Williamsburg International Film Festival.

In June 2013, Fayre released a self-titled EP featuring five songs, including "Belong to You." A few weeks later, she uploaded a music video for another song from her EP titled "Jukebox Love." In August 2013, the "Unsigned Only Music Competition" announced that Fayre finished second in the "Teen" category of its 2013 edition with her song "Silver," also from the same EP. In November 2013, Fayre released a video for yet another song off her EP, titled "Love Burning Alive." The album also caught the attention of the music press with Rolling Stone magazine featuring her in a February 2014 online article headlined "10 New Artists You Need To Know."

In July 2014, Fayre dropped a single titled "I Am Not a Man," which was included on her debut album titled Oko, which she released in August 2014. To promote Oko, Fayre performed at venues throughout Southern California during the summer of 2014, impressing music bloggers. In September 2014, Fayre released a music video for "I Am Not a Man." In November 2014, she uploaded a video with an acoustic version of one of the songs from Oko, titled "Start a War." Months later, she released a video for a third song from the album, called "Everybody’s In".

The artist released a single titled "This World" in February 2015. Spotify included "This World" in a curated playlist titled Women of Indie & Alternative and the song was also featured in an episode of The CW network show The Vampire Diaries. Almost concurrently, Fayre released a video for "This World".

In May 2015, the American Society of Composers, Authors and Publishers (ASCAP) announced that Fayre was a winner of their 2015 "I Create Music" EXPO Opportunity in Los Angeles.

In April 2015, Fayre performed live at SXSW in Austin, Texas for Daytrotter. On May 20, 2015, Noisey, a website owned by the popular print/online magazine VICE, premiered "Do You Like That?," a track from Lena Fayre's EP Is There Only One?, and announced that this EP would be released in late July 2015. On June 15, 2015, SPIN premiered a second track from the album, titled "Colors of Leaving."

After a month-long residency at Bootleg Theater in Hollywood in February 2016, Lena Fayre was an Official Showcase Artist at SXSW in March 2016. Also in the same month, the artist won two songwriting awards: Grand Prize Winner in Session II of The John Lennon Songwriting Contest in the World Music Category for her song "Ophelia", and Winner of "LOVE," a songwriting contest organized by The John Lennon Songwriting Contest in partnership with American Heart Association & Women's International Music Network. Fayre won the latter contest with her song "Love Burning Alive" and was invited to perform at The Grammy Museum for the American Heart Association's Rock the Red event in late April 2016.

On April 18, 2016, fashion and culture magazine Flaunt premiered the music video for Fayre's single "Cry" on Flaunt.com with the headline: "Our electropop crush drops her latest video and it's a real chiller." Later in April, NPR member station KCRW featured Fayre and her song "Cry" in their music blog under the caption "Artists You Should Know" and described Fayre's accomplishments to date with the statement: "it all adds up to an artist on the move!"

Discography

Albums
 Oko (2014)

EPs
 Lena Fayre (2013)
 Is There Only One? (2015)

Singles
 "Belong to You" (2012)
 "I Am Not a Man" (2014)
 "This World" (2015)
 "Cry" (2016)

Music videos

Awards

References

External links
 Official website
 
 Lena Fayre interview Interview
 Lena Fayre interview LA Weekly

American women singer-songwriters
1996 births
Living people
21st-century American singers
21st-century American women singers